The Cliff is the shuttle system of Emory University's main Druid Hills campus in Atlanta.

The Cliff is the largest public transportation system in Atlanta other than MARTA. It consists of a fleet of 40 buses, all electric, compressed natural gas, or biofuel. 100% of the fleet is powered by biodiesel created from recycled cooking oil from the school's cafeteria. Buses operate 24 hours a day .

The 40 bus fleet consists of buses 201–239 and ParaTransit bus. Buses 201–210 are large buses, Buses 211–233 are medium buses, and 234–239 and the paratransit bus are small buses.

As of 2008, average ridership was 200,000 trips per month; daily ridership averaged 2,300 for its park-n-ride routes. In 2010, the annual ridership was 2,593,851.

As of May 2016, The Cliff operated 9 campus routes, 4 commuter routes (to Decatur, North Druid Hills, North DeKalb Mall and South DeKalb Mall), 3 hospital routes including service to Grady, Emory Midtown Hospital, and the Veteran's Affairs Hospital; and 7 other routes (service to Georgia Tech, Emory's Oxford campus, Clairmont campus, and Briarcliff campus, Lenox Square mall, Publix supermarket, the Toco Hills shopping center, and the Yerkes Research Center). Many of the routes also stop at transfer stations with MARTA.

External links
Official website

References

Transportation in Atlanta
Emory University